Thomas B. Woodward is an Episcopal priest in the Diocese of the Rio Grande, Santa Fe, New Mexico, where he lives with his wife Ann. Woodward was a steering committee member of "The Episcopal Majority", an organization within the Episcopal Church created to counter the attacks upon the church from various self-styled orthodox groups. In 2006, Woodward was appointed to the Executive Council’s Committee on the Status of Women and then elected as Secretary. He was recently the Priest in charge of St. Paul's Peace Church, a joint Episcopal and Lutheran church in Las Vegas, New Mexico.

Woodward served The Episcopal Church over two decades as university chaplain at several campuses, including the University of Kansas, Missouri State University in Warrensburg, the University of Rochester, the University of North Carolina and the University of Wisconsin in Madison. He served as rector of Christ Church, Warrensburg and of St. Paul's Episcopal Church in Salinas, California, which was John Steinbeck's parish church. While serving in Salinas, he was awarded The Ben Heller Award for Courage and Leadership in Service to the Farmworker Community and The Bishop's Cross from the Episcopal Diocese of El Camino Real for his leadership in shepherding the diocese through a difficult time. In 1982 he led his congregation in Madison, Wisconsin in their becoming the first Episcopal Church in the country to provide public sanctuary to political refugees from El Salvador and Guatemala, all captured in the PBS documentary, "The New Underground Railroad." Earlier he had been arrested for his part in a civil rights demonstration at the University of Kansas (1965) and then arrested again in Rochester, New York while providing pastoral care for university students involved in a protest against the war in Viet Nam.

While in Madison, Governor Tony Earl appointed Tom to serve as Trustee of the State of Wisconsin Investment Board, sharing in the oversight of the investments of over 85 billion dollars. While there he served as liaison to the State Legislature and co-authored the State of Wisconsin Active Investment Program which involved the Investment Board in active negotiations with the companies in which the Board was invested on matters of shareholder interest (poison pill, excessive management enrichment, etc.) and social and social justice issues (promotion of women, provision of childcare, current social justice issues). That program was soon adopted by the pension fund boards of California, New York, and New Jersey as well as the Windsor mutual funds. He was then hired to revise the Sullivan Principles which had guided U. S. investments in South Africa. Later, in California, Tom wrote for the digital campaign of President Obama's second campaign for the Presidency.

For the past 35 years, Tom has had a parallel career as a street performer, presenting his one-man show, "Uncle Billy's Pocket Circus," consisting of fire eating, juggling, magic and mime in nearly every state of the U.S. as well as overseas and in South America. As an extension of that vocation, while in Madison, Wisconsin he organized "The Care Fools," a clown troupe of disabled men and women who entertained in hospitals, nursing homes, parades, and university campuses. A high point in his career was performing as the banquet entertainment at a National Convention of the International Jugglers' Association.

He has written two books for Seabury Press, Turning Things Upside Down and To Celebrate, and more recently The Undermining of the Episcopal Church, published by The Episcopal Majority. His articles have appeared in Modern Liturgy, The Witness Magazine, The Covenant Journal, Red Rubber Noses and The London Times on-line edition. His "The Parables of Jesus from the Inside," first published by The Sewanee Theological Review, is currently being expanded into a book. His "The Case for Luke's Gospel Having Been Written by a Woman" is in the process of being published in a theological journal. He and Max McGuire, writer for the NRA and Conservative-Daily, are currently co-authoring a book, "A Tea Party Guy and a Left Wing Social Activist Walk Into a Bar. . .," which focuses on the respect each has shown the other in over two years of engagement over political hot button issues.

In the past several years, seven of his fifteen-minute plays have been produced by The Santa Fe Playhouse in their annual Benchwarmer series. One of those plays, Body and Soul, served as the Keynote Event at a recent national convention of psychotherapists. His latest play, I'll Have What He's Having, was produced in Santa Fe by Ironweed Productions.

Recently, Woodward collaborated as librettist with Daniel Steven Crafts, the originator of a new genre of opera called "Gonzo Opera," in the creation of two operas in that genre, "And the Winner Is. ." and "All the Right Moves." The characteristics of Gonzo Opera include music that is both melodious and memorable, a libretto that is comic and often satirical, and production values that make it possible to produce the operas simply and inexpensively—all in the service of appealing to young people from the ages of 25 to 45 years old who normally do not attend traditional operas. Selections from "And the Winner Is . . " were performed at the Abiquiu Chamber Music Festival in 2012 and was later sung in part in Hood River, Oregon and in Berkeley, California in November 2013. The full opera debuted at The Cell Theater in Albuquerque in June 2017. "All the Right Moves" will debut at The Cell in 2018.

Tom and his wife, Ann, have five children—Thomas B. Woodward, Jr., Jennifer R. Gibson, Joy P. Williams, Thomas F. Cunningham and David C. Cunningham as well as seven grandchildren (Allison Blackburn, Taylar Woodward, Tristan Cunningham, Austin Paul, Emma Gibson, and Guy and Owen Williams).

Publications
...To celebrate;: ...explorations and discoveries in Christian learning for families in the home...children in the church school...the congregation in the family service, Thomas B. Woodward, Seabury Press, 1973,  
Turning things upside-down: A theological workbook, Thomas B. Woodward,  Seabury Press, 1975, 
So, What's Up with Eliot?, The Richest Man in Santa Fe, Body and Soul, "And the Winner Is. ..", "The Smedleys Are Here", "Xenaphobia," and "Funny You Should Ask" seven one act plays produced at The Santa Fe Playhouse.
"I'll Have What He's Having," a 15-minute play, produced by Ironweed Productions in Santa Fe, New Mexico.
In collaboration with composer Daniel Steven Crafts, two Gonzo Operas:  
"And the Winner Is . ." composed by Daniel Steven Crafts with libretto by Tom Woodward, debuting in Albuquerque, June 2016.
"All the Right Moves" composed by Daniel Steven Crafts with libretto by Tom Woodward, debuting in Albuquerque in 2017.

References

External links
Thomas Woodward blog
Thomas Woodward contributor

American Episcopal priests
Living people
Year of birth missing (living people)
People from Santa Fe, New Mexico
University and college chaplains in America